Herbert Hirschman (April 13, 1914 – July 3, 1985) was an American television producer and director. He produced shows as Perry Mason and the fourth season of The Twilight Zone. Hirschman died in July 1985 of an illness, at the age of 71.

Filmography

References

External links

1914 births
1985 deaths
American television directors
American television producers